Lorenzo Ferrari (born 9 March 1996) is an Italian football player.

Club career
He made his professional debut in the Lega Pro for Rimini on 5 March 2016 in a game against Pisa.

On 13 July 2019, he joined Siena on a one-year contract.

International
He represented Italy national under-17 football team at the 2013 FIFA U-17 World Cup.

References

External links
 

1996 births
Sportspeople from Cremona
Living people
Italian footballers
Hellas Verona F.C. players
Rimini F.C. 1912 players
S.S. Arezzo players
A.C.N. Siena 1904 players
Serie B players
Serie C players
Italy youth international footballers
Italy under-21 international footballers
Association football goalkeepers
Footballers from Lombardy